Agathe Ursula Backer Grøndahl (1 December 1847 – 4 June 1907) was a Norwegian pianist and composer. Her son Fridtjof Backer-Grøndahl (1885–1959) was also a pianist and composer, who promoted his mother's compositions in his concerts.

Biography
Agathe Ursula Backer was born in Holmestrand in 1847, in a wealthy and art-loving home, as the second youngest of four sisters, all gifted in drawing and music. In 1857 she moved with her family to Christiania, where she studied with Otto Winther-Hjelm, Halfdan Kjerulf and Ludvig Mathias Lindeman. Between 1865 and 1867 she became a pupil of Theodor Kullak and studied composition under Richard Wuerst at the Akademie der Tonkunst in Berlin, where she lived together with her sister Harriet Backer. She won fame there with her interpretation of Beethoven's "Emperor" Concerto.

After her arrival to Norway in 1868, she debuted with Edvard Grieg, then 26 years old, as conductor of the Philharmonic Society. A recommendation from Ole Bull led to further studies with Hans von Bülow in Florence in 1871. Later the same year she played at the Gewandhaus in Leipzig, becoming a pupil of Franz Liszt in Weimar in 1873. In 1874 she married the conductor and singing teacher Olaus Andreas Grøndahl, and was generally known thereafter as Agathe Backer Grøndahl. During the second half of the 1870s she built up an outstanding pianist career with a series of concerts in the Nordic countries, also playing with very great success in London and Paris.

In 1889 and 1890 she gave concerts in London and Birmingham with a wide-ranging program, including Grieg's piano concerto. After that she was proclaimed one of the century's greatest piano artists by George Bernard Shaw, who also remarked on the sensitiveness, symmetry and artistic economy of her compositions. At the World Exhibition in Paris in 1889, she repeated her success with her brilliant interpretation of Grieg's piano concerto. It was then that she began experiencing nerve problems, although she eventually resumed her artistic career as a pianist. Later in the 1890s she became almost completely deaf. She gave her last concerts in Sweden and Finland in the autumn of 1901. Then she retired to teaching.

As a teacher she was markedly successful and influential. Her students included Erika Stang and Bertha Tapper. Her children studied under her and are counted with her gifted pupils. She was the author of many songs and a great deal of music for the piano, and both as pianist and composer stands at the head of modern music in Norway. Agathe Backer Grøndahl died at her home in Ormøya, outside Christiania, at the age of 59. She is today chiefly remembered for her piano pieces and songs.

Compositional style 
Agathe Backer Grøndahl played a major role in the period often called the golden age of Norwegian music history. She composed in total some 400 pieces spanning seventy opus numbers. She was a prominent character on the Norwegian musical scene and a close friend of Edvard Grieg. Her earlier compositions synthesized the predominant pianistic and stylistic ideas of 1850s Europe. In her later years however, her style transformed and anticipated some of the early twentieth century impressionistic ideas, which ultimately led the composer Pauline Hall to call her the first true Norwegian impressionist.

List of works

Songs 
3 Songs, Op. 1, (1868–9)
5 Songs, Op. 2, (1871)
5 Songs, Op. 3, (1870–73)
7 Songs, Op. 4, (1869–74)
4 Songs, Op. 5, (1871–2)
6 Songs, Op. 6 (1867–71)
Summer Life, 4 Songs, Op. 7
5 Songs, Op. 8 (1871–6)
6 Songs, Op. 9 (1871–9)
4 Songs, Op. 10 (1871–5)
5 Songs, Op. 12 (1879)
5 Songs, Op. 13 (1881)
6 deutsche Lieder, Op. 14
6 Songs, Op. 16
Songs at Sea, Op. 17 (1884)
7 Folkeviser og Romanser, Op. 18
Serenade, Op. 21 (1888)
5 Songs, Op. 23 (1888)
6 Songs, Op. 26 (1890)
6 Songs, Op. 27 (1890)
Chant de Noces: Bryllupsmorgen, Op. 28 (1890)
10 Songs, Op. 29, (1892)
10 Songs, Op. 31, (1894)
Norske folkeviser, arrangements, Op. 34 (1894)
The Night is Calm, Old Folks Waltz, Op. 40 (1897)
5 Songs, Op. 41 (1897)
The Child's Spring Day, song cycle, Op. 42 (1899)
8 kjaempeviser, Op. 43 (1896–7)
20 folke- og skjaemteviser, Op. 43 (1896–7)
5 Songs, Op. 46, (1897–9)
2 Sange fra havet, Op. 48
3 Sange i moll, Op. 49
Sommer (Jynge), 8 songs, Op. 50 (1899)
12 folkeviser og melodier fra fremmede lande, Op. 51 (1902)
The Mother Sings, 8 songs, Op. 52 (1900)
Sydover 6 songs, Op. 54 1900
Ahasverus, 6 songs, Op. 56 (1900)
6 deutsche Liebeslieder aus der Jugend, Op. 60 (1869–1900)
Clover Field, Op. 62 (1901)
4 Songs, Op. 65 (1901–4)
One more Glimpse, Op. 70 (1907)

Piano solo 
6 concert-etuder, Op. 11 (1881)
3 morceaux, Op. 15 (1882)
4 , Op. 19 (1886)
Suite, 5 movements Op. 20 (1887)
3 études, Op. 22 (1888)
6 idylles, Op. 24 (1888)
3 klaverstykker, Op. 25 (1890)
Norske folkeviser og folkedanse, Op. 30 (1891)
3 études de concert, Op. 32 (Copenhagen, 1895)
Norske folkeviser og folkedanse, Op. 33 (1894)
3 klaverstykker, Op. 35 (1894)
Fantasistykker, Op. 36 (1895)
Serenade, Op. 37 (1896)
3 ungarske studier, Op. 38 (1896)
Fantasistykker, Op. 39 (1896)
In the Blue Mountain, fairytale suite, 6 pieces, Op. 44 (1897)
Fantasistykker, Op. 45 (1897)
Etudes de concert, Op. 47 (Copenhagen, 1901)
3 klaverstykker, Op. 53 (1900)
Smaa fantasistykker, Op. 55 (1902)
Etudes de concert, Op. 57 (Copenhagen, 1903)
Concert-études, Op. 58 (Copenhagen, 1903)
6 klaverstykker, Op. 59 (1903)
Prélude, Op.61, No. 1 (Copenhagen, 1904)
Grand menuet, Op.61, No. 2
Lettere fantasistykker, Op. 63 (Copenhagen, 1904)
Danse burlesque, Op.64, No. 1 (1905)
Valse caprice, Op.64, No. 2
Barnlige Billeder [Children Pictures], 6 fantasias, Op. 66 (1905)
2 klaverstykker, Op. 68 (1907)
3 klaverstykker, Op. 69 (1907)

Discography 
Kirsten Flagstad-Songs (1994)
Kirsten Flagstad Early Recordings 1914-1941 (1995)
The Danish Nightingale (1995)
Povla Frijsh - The Complete Recordings (1995)
Women Composers (1996)
Women's Voices: Five Centuries of Song (1997)
Norsk Romances (2000)
Bravourisimo - Wiener Boheme Quartett (2000)
Agathe Backer Grøndahl (2000)
Agathe Backer Grøndahl: Piano Music (2001)
Norwegian Classical Favorites (2004)
Women's Work: Solo Piano Music (2006)
Noel (2006)
Agathe Backer Grøndahl: Complete Piano Music, Vols. 1 - 5: Natalia Strelchenko (2007)

Notes

References

External links 

Vocal texts with translations at The LiederNet Archive
Grinde, Nils: "Grondahl, Agathe Backer (Ursula)", Grove Music Online ed. L. Macy (Accessed 28 March 2007)
Agathe Backer Grøndahl at Leonarda Records
Fantasistykker at Pianopedia.com
Hambro, Camilla: Agathe Backer Grøndahl (1847–1907): "A perfectly plain woman?, The Kapralova Society Journal (2009), vol. 7 no. 1

1847 births
1907 deaths
19th-century classical composers
19th-century classical pianists
19th-century Norwegian composers
19th-century Norwegian pianists
20th-century classical composers
20th-century classical pianists
20th-century Norwegian composers
20th-century Norwegian pianists
Burials at the Cemetery of Our Saviour
Deaf classical musicians
Norwegian deaf people
Women classical composers
Norwegian classical composers
Norwegian classical pianists
Norwegian Romantic composers
Women classical pianists
20th-century women composers
19th-century women composers
People from Holmestrand
19th-century women pianists
20th-century women pianists